Breno Washington Rodrigues da Silva (born 1 September 2000), known simply as Breno, is a Brazilian professional footballer who plays as a defensive midfielder for Botafogo.

Professional career
Breno made his professional debut with Goiás in a 3-0 Campeonato Brasileiro Série A win over Fluminense FC on 22 September 2019.

References

External links
 

2000 births
Living people
Sportspeople from Amapá
Brazilian footballers
Association football midfielders
Campeonato Brasileiro Série A players
Campeonato Brasileiro Série B players
Goiás Esporte Clube players
Botafogo de Futebol e Regatas players